Isambard is a given name. It is Norman, of Germanic origin, meaning either "iron-bright" or "iron-axe". The first element comes from isarn meaning iron (or steel).  The second element comes from either biart-r (bright, glorious) or from barđa (a broad axe). It was used by:

 Marc Isambard Brunel (1769–1849), French-born engineer
 Isambard Kingdom Brunel (1806–1859), British engineer, son of Marc Isambard Brunel
 Sir Isambard Owen (1850–1927), British physician and university academic, son of an employee of Isambard Kingdom Brunel

Variation 
 Isambart (8th century), Frankish count

See also
 Isembard (disambiguation)
 Isambard Brunel (disambiguation)

References